Shunsen may refer to:

 the Japanese reading of the name of the South Korean city Chuncheon
 an art name of the Japanese painter Kanō Tomonobu